Adam de Port can refer to several Anglo-Norman noblemen:

 Adam de Port (d. c. 1133)
 Adam de Port (d. 1174)
 Adam de Port (d. c. 1213)